Rokesh is an Indian lyricist working on Tamil language films, who specialises in song lyrics containing Madras Bashai.

Career
Rokesh worked as a machine operator in the Parry's area of Chennai and had established a reputation for being a gana songwriter in his local area, Vyasarpadi. Rokesh was first introduced to K. V. Anand & Harris Jayaraj by Kiran, who worked as the art director for Anand's film Anegan (2015). The director - music director duo gave Rokesh a list of 150 words of North Madras specific vocabulary for reference and explained the situation for a song, and Rokesh returned with the final version of "Danga Maari" during the next day. He has since gone on to write songs for other films including Maari and Vedalam (2015).

Filmography

References

Tamil film poets
Indian lyricists
Living people
1993 births